Waldstetten is a town in the German state of Baden-Württemberg, in Ostalbkreis district.

Economy and Infrastructure

Established businesses

Industry- Mostly medium and small sized enterprises are located in Waldstetten, including "Leicht Küchen," a kitchen manufacturer, established in 1928, which has approximately 850 employees in Germany.

Education
In Waldsteten is the Franz von Assisi -School", a free Catholic Realschule. There is also the "Unterm Hohenrechberg" school. Additionally, there is a pure primary school in Wißgoldingen. 
Child care in Waldstetten is provided by four Roman Catholic kindergartens.

Regular events
The Albmarathon, a 50-kilometer (30 mile) ultramarathon runs regularly through the municipality.

Sons and daughters of the town
 Bernhard Rieger (1922–2013), a Catholic theologian and Auxiliary Bishop of the Diocese of Rottenburg-Stuttgart

Other personalities
 Michael Brenner (born 1960), jurist, professor of German and European Constitutional and Administrative Law at the University of Jena, lives in Waldstetten.
 Simon Baumgarten (born 1985), handball player, grew up in Wißgoldingen and attended the Realschule Waldstetten.
 Dominik Kaiser (born 1988), football player, played in his youth for TSGV Waldstetten.
 Carina Vogt (born 1992), German ski jumper and Olympic champion, lives in Waldstetten.

References

Ostalbkreis